This is the full list of Egyptian billionaires according to Forbes (2022):

See also
 List of wealthiest families

References

 
Lists of people by wealth
Economy of Egypt-related lists